Herbert Dick (born 2 September 1979) is a Zimbabwean retired footballer who played as central defender.

Dick was a member of Zimbabwe national football team, and participated in the 2006 African Cup of Nations. In the 2006–07 season he was a player for Legia Warsaw, he made his debut in the Polish Ekstraklasa in the match against Arka Gdynia (8 September 2006).

Club honours
Amazulu
 Zimbabwe Premier Soccer League (1): 2003

External links
 
 

1979 births
Living people
Zimbabwean footballers
Zimbabwe international footballers
2006 Africa Cup of Nations players
Dynamos F.C. players
Legia Warsaw players
Expatriate footballers in Poland
Zimbabwean expatriate sportspeople in Poland
Zimbabwean expatriate footballers
Association football defenders
Sportspeople from Kadoma, Zimbabwe
How Mine F.C. players
Chicken Inn F.C. players
Highlanders F.C. players